The name Ismael was used for three tropical cyclones in the Eastern Pacific Ocean:

Hurricane Ismael (1983), traveled generally northward
Hurricane Ismael (1989), brought heavy rain to Acapulco
Hurricane Ismael (1995), caused over 100 fatalities in Mexico

The name Ismael was retired after the 1995 Eastern Pacific hurricane season and replaced with Ivo beginning in the 2001 season.

Pacific hurricane set index articles